Harsiesis  is a butterfly genus from the subfamily Satyrinae in the family Nymphalidae. The genus was erected by Hans Fruhstorfer in 1911. The species are found in Indonesia.

Species
Listed alphabetically:
Harsiesis hygea (Hewitson, [1863])
Harsiesis hecaerge (Hewitson, 1863)
Harsiesis yolanthe Fruhstorfer, 1913

References

Satyrini
Butterfly genera
Taxa named by Hans Fruhstorfer